Agasthya Kavi composed 74 works of poetry in Sanskrit in the 14th century. He was from Warangal.

References 

14th-century Indian poets
Sanskrit literature
Sanskrit poets
Indian male poets
Poets from Telangana